Lewis Ridge is a rugged, ice-covered ridge,  long, extending eastward from the Holland Range, Antarctica, between Morton Glacier and Hewitt Glacier, and terminating at Richards Inlet. It was named by the Advisory Committee on Antarctic Names for Commander G.H. Lewis, U.S. Navy, commanding officer of the  during U.S. Navy Operation Deep Freeze, 1964.

References

Ridges of the Ross Dependency
Shackleton Coast